Shoreditch High Street is a London Overground station located on Bethnal Green Road in Shoreditch in East London.

The station officially opened to the public on 27 April 2010 and replaced nearby tube station , which was directly to the east and closed in 2006.

History
On the 1994 planning version of the underground map, the station was called 'Bishopsgate'.

In May 2008 Abdal Ullah, a Tower Hamlets London Borough Councillor, called for the new station to be renamed Banglatown, claiming this would better reflect the area in which it will stand, being a centre of the Bangladeshi community. However Transport for London noted that changing the name would cost £2 million and "cause confusion". Councillor Ullah had previously campaigned to change the name of Aldgate East Underground station to "Brick Lane".

The station was built on the former site of the Eastern Counties Railway's Shoreditch station, built in 1840. The original station was later renamed Bishopsgate and converted for use as a goods yard. It was destroyed by fire in 1964 and remained derelict until being demolished in 2003–04, with the exception of a number of Grade II listed structures: ornamental gates on Shoreditch High Street and the remaining  of the "Braithwaite Viaduct", one of the oldest railway structures in the world and the second-oldest in London, designed by John Braithwaite.

The present station is built on upright supports as a viaduct, being fully enclosed in a concrete box structure. This is so future building works on the remainder of the Bishopsgate site can be undertaken keeping the station operational. Future buildings have the option of being constructed over the station. The station is situated on a section of track constructed to link the original East London Line and the formerly disused North London Railway's Kingsland Viaduct. Construction of the link included a new bridge over Shoreditch High Street and links to Whitechapel via a bridge over Brick Lane and a ramp on the site of the former Shoreditch tube station.

London Overground began running 24-hour trains on Friday and Saturday nights between Dalston Junction and New Cross Gate which called at Shoreditch High Street from 15 December 2017.

Services and connections

Mondays to Saturdays there is a service every 5–10 minutes throughout the day, while on Sundays before 13:00 there is a service every 5–9 minutes, changing to every 7–8 minutes until the end of service after that.

Current off peak frequency in trains per per hour is:

4 tph to 
4 tph to 
4 tph to West Croydon
4 tph to  via 

London Bus routes 8, 26, 35, 47, 78, 135, 149, 205, 242, 388 and night routes N8, N26, N205 and N242 serve the station.

Future proposals
There have also been discussions of creating an interchange with the Central line between Liverpool Street and Bethnal Green which runs almost underneath the station. However, this would not be able to happen until after the Crossrail 1 project is complete, due to extreme crowding on the Central line during peak hours.

Notes and references

Notes

References

External links

Bishopsgate Goods Station (Goodsyard) from Subterrranea Britannica
BBC News, Giant bridge fitted for rail line
Alwaystouchout.com, East London Line Extensions

Railway stations in the London Borough of Hackney
Railway stations in the London Borough of Tower Hamlets
Railway stations opened by Network Rail
Railway stations in Great Britain opened in 2010
Railway stations served by London Overground
Railway station
London Overground Night Overground stations